Reza Dehghan (born 1 July 1997) is an Iranian football player who plays as midfielder for the Persian Gulf Pro League club Foolad.

References

External links
 

1997 births
Living people
Iranian footballers
Shahin Bushehr F.C. players
Foolad FC players
Association football defenders